Stanley Edward Brady (20 April 1887 – 20 June 1921) was an Australian rules footballer who played with St Kilda in the Victorian Football League (VFL). He died from pleurisy and pneumonia at the age of 34.

Notes

External links 

1887 births
1921 deaths
Australian rules footballers from Victoria (Australia)
St Kilda Football Club players
Murtoa Football Club players
Australian military personnel of World War I
Deaths from pneumonia in Victoria (Australia)